The 2018–19 Burger King Super Smash was the twelfth season of the women's Super Smash Twenty20 cricket competition played in New Zealand. It ran from October 2018 to January 2019, with 6 provincial teams taking part. Wellington Blaze beat Canterbury Magicians in the final to win the tournament, their 5th Super Smash title, and second in two seasons.

The tournament ran alongside the 2018–19 Hallyburton Johnstone Shield.

Competition format 
Teams played in a double round-robin in a group of six, therefore playing 10 matches overall. Matches were played using a Twenty20 format. The top two in the group advanced to the final.

The group worked on a points system with positions being based on the total points. Points were awarded as follows:

Win: 4 points 
Loss: 0 points.
Abandoned/No Result: 2 points.

Points table

Source: New Zealand Cricket

 Advanced to the Final

Final

Statistics

Most runs

Source: ESPN Cricinfo

Most wickets

Source: ESPN Cricinfo

References

External links
 Series home at ESPN Cricinfo

Super Smash (cricket)
2018–19 New Zealand cricket season
Super Smash (women's cricket)